The Hanson Ministry was the 4th Ministry of the Government of South Australia, led by Premier Richard Hanson. It commenced on 30 September 1857 with the defeat of the Torrens Ministry on the floor of the House of Assembly. It fell after losing a confidence vote, and was replaced by Thomas Reynolds' First Ministry.

Hanson's Ministry was the first in South Australia to include a former Premier, Boyle Finniss.

Composition of ministry

References

South Australian ministries
1857 establishments in Australia